Loaded is the second studio album by Busy Signal. It was released on September 23, 2008. The album features the hit singles "Jail", "Whine Pon Di Edge" and "These Are the Days". Guest appearances include Mykal Roze and Alborosie.

Track listing
 "People So Evil" – 2:57
 "Jail" – 3:10
 "Tic Toc" – 3:08
 "Wine Pon Di Edge" – 2:37
 "Fast, Fast, Fast, Fast" – 2:31
 "Hey Girl" – 2:26
 "Real Jamaican" (featuring Mykal Roze) – 3:16
 "Unknown Number" – 3:15
 "These Are the Days" – 3:31
 "Hustle Hard" – 0:39
 "My World" – 3:05
 "Strappings" – 0:29
 "Cool Baby" – 2:46
 "Knocking At Your Door" – 3:00
 "Murderer" (featuring Alborosie) – 6:52

External links

Busy Signal albums
2008 albums